Tony Dee Onnen (born July 5, 1938) is an American politician in the state of Minnesota. He served in the Minnesota House of Representatives.

References

1938 births
Living people
Republican Party members of the Minnesota House of Representatives